The 2019 Engie Open de Biarritz was a professional tennis tournament played on outdoor clay courts. It was the seventeenth edition of the tournament which was part of the 2019 ITF Women's World Tennis Tour. It took place in Biarritz, France between 15 and 21 July 2019.

Singles main-draw entrants

Seeds

 1 Rankings are as of 1 July 2019.

Other entrants
The following players received wildcards into the singles main draw:
  Loudmilla Bencheikh
  Sara Cakarevic
  Séléna Janicijevic
  Alizé Lim

The following players received entry from the qualifying draw:
  Lucía Cortez Llorca
  Kélia Le Bihan
  Diane Parry
  Irina Ramialison
  Victoria Rodríguez
  Ioana Loredana Roșca
  Gaia Sanesi
  Sofia Shapatava

Champions

Singles

 Viktoriya Tomova def.  Danka Kovinić, 6–2, 5–7, 7–5

Doubles

 Manon Arcangioli /  Kimberley Zimmermann def.  Victoria Rodríguez /  Ioana Loredana Roșca, 2–6, 6–3, [10–6]

References

External links
 2019 Engie Open de Biarritz at ITFtennis.com
 Official website

2019 ITF Women's World Tennis Tour
2019 in French tennis
Open de Biarritz